The Ba-Phalaborwa Local Municipality is a Local Municipality in Limpopo, South Africa. The council consists of thirty-seven members elected by mixed-member proportional representation. Nineteen councillors are elected by first-past-the-post voting in nineteen wards, while the remaining eighteen are chosen from party lists so that the total number of party representatives is proportional to the number of votes received. In the election of 1 November 2021 the African National Congress (ANC) won a majority of 24 seats.

Results 
The following table shows the composition of the council after past elections.

March 2006 election

The following table shows the results of the 2006 election.

May 2011 election

The following table shows the results of the 2011 election.

August 2016 election

The following table shows the results of the 2016 election.

November 2021 election

The following table shows the results of the 2021 election.

References

Ba-Phalaborwa
Elections in Limpopo
Mopani District Municipality